The Ontario Legislative Building is a structure in central Toronto, Ontario, Canada. It houses the Legislative Assembly of Ontario, and the viceregal suite of the Lieutenant Governor of Ontario and offices for members of the provincial parliament (MPPs). The building is surrounded by Queen's Park, sitting on that part south of Wellesley Street, which is the former site of King's College (later the University of Toronto), which was leased from the university by the municipal government of Toronto in 1859, for a "peppercorn" payment of CAD$1 per annum on a 999-year term. The southern portion of the site was later handed over to the provincial government.

The building and the provincial government are both often referred to by the metonym "Queen's Park".

Characteristics

Designed by Richard A. Waite, the Ontario Legislative Building is an asymmetrical, five-storey structure built in the Richardsonian Romanesque style, with a load-bearing iron frame. This is clad inside and out in Canadian materials where possible; the 10.5 million bricks were made by inmates of the Central Prison, and the Ontario sandstone—with a pink hue that has earned the building the colloquial name of The Pink Palace—comes from the Credit River valley and Orangeville, Ontario, and was given a rustic finish for most of the exterior, but dressed for trim around windows and other edges. There can also be seen over the edifice a multitude of stone carvings, including gargoyles, grotesques, and friezes. The exterior is punctuated with uncharacteristically large windows, allowed by the nature of the iron structure.

The 1909 North Wing was built by noted Toronto architect George Wallace Gouinlock and E.J. Lennox added two floors to the west wing.

The main façade fronts south, with the central axis of the building an extension of that for University Avenue, meaning that the Legislative Building creates a terminating vista for the north end of that main thoroughfare. The Legislative Chamber is directly on this axis, in the centre of the building, and is lit by the three large and prominent arched windows above the main portico. This block is flanked by two domed towers, the west of which was originally intended to hold a clock, but was fitted with a rose window instead, after funds for the clock were never amassed. 

The asymmetry of the south face was not originally as strong as it is at present; the west wing was designed to have three storeys under a pyramidal roof, as the east wing is still formed nowadays. After the fire of 1909, however, the west side of the Legislative Building was repaired and expanded, with an added fourth floor that bears wall dormer windows in a long, gabled roof. At the far termini of the east–west axis, the wings each turn at right angles and extend north, enclosing a three-sided courtyard, in which sits the 1909 block, a free-standing, four storey structure that is rectangular in plan.

Inside, a central hall runs between the main entrance at the south and a grand staircase directly opposite, from the mid-landing of which is accessed the parliamentary library in the 1909 block. At the top landing of this stair is the lobby of the legislative chamber, with the door to which centrally aligned in the south wall. From this core, wide corridors extend east and west, each bisected by a long and narrow atrium lined with ornate railings; the east wing is decorated more in the Victorian fashion in which it was built, with dark wood panelling, while the west wing corridor is more Edwardian Neoclassical in style, the walls lined with white marble, and reflecting the time in which it was built.

To the south of the Legislative Building is an open area with extensive tree cover, which is often used for public gatherings and demonstrations. The provincial ministries are housed in the separate Ontario Government Buildings complex to the east, including the Macdonald complex (composed of the Hearst, Mowat, Ferguson and Hepburn towers) and the Whitney Block.

The building is featured on both the front and back covers of Rush's 1981 album Moving Pictures.

Lieutenant Governor's Suite

At the north-west corner of the building is the Lieutenant Governor's Suite, which has housed the office of the  Lieutenant Governor of Ontario since 1937, when Ontario sold the province's Government House to the Government of Canada. The space was previously used as the Cabinet dining room and the Speaker's apartment.

The suite is a three-storey complex, with its own ceremonial staircase and elevator entrances where members of the Canadian Royal Family and visiting dignitaries are greeted. A rose garden, donated by the Monarchist League of Canada in honour of the Silver Jubilee of Elizabeth II in 1977, and added to for the Golden and Diamond Jubilees, sits on the west side of the building across the driveway.

Inside are reception rooms, a state dining room, staff offices, and a kitchen, arranged around a central stair hall. The furnishings and chandeliers throughout the suite came from the last government house, Chorley Park, and paintings come from the Government of Ontario Art Collection and the Toronto Public Library. Special art exhibitions are also commissioned from time to time.

The Music Room is the largest space in the viceregal suite, and is the site of New Years' Levées, swearing-in ceremonies for cabinet ministers, and presentations of and investitures for provincial honours.

Portraits
The suite is also home to portraits of some the past Lieutenant Governors of Ontario as well as:

 Queen Elizabeth II and The Duke of Edinburgh, and the Lieutenant Governor
 large portrait of Upper Canada's first Lieutenant Governor John Graves Simcoe by painted Sir Edmund Wyly Grier (loan from the Toronto Public Library.)

History

Early structures

The present Ontario Legislative Building is the seventh such structure to serve as Ontario's parliament building. Either Navy Hall or the Freemasons Hall in Newark, Upper Canada (today Niagara-on-the-Lake, Ontario), served as the first legislature, where the initial meeting of the House of Assembly occurred on 17 September 1791. Only three years later, however, construction began on a dedicated parliament building in York (now Toronto), as it was felt by Lieutenant Governor John Graves Simcoe that the presence of a provincial capital directly across the border from the United States was too great a risk, especially as the relations between the US and Britain were then tense. By June the complex, located at the intersection of Front and Parliament Streets, was completed, and the humble wood structures were dubbed the Palace of Parliament (The structure resembled two military barracks).

The relocation to York did not ensure the protection of the capital, however, and the Palace of Parliament was destroyed by fire on 27 April 1813, as a consequence of an attack on the city in the War of 1812. The House of Assembly then met once in the ballroom of the York Hotel (between King and Front Streets), and regularly, from then until 1820, at the home of Chief Justice of the Court of the King's Bench William Henry Draper, which was located at the present intersection of Wellington and York Streets. The new parliament buildings was a two-storey Georgian architecture structure, put up on the site of the previous structure, stood only for four years, succumbing to an accidental fire on 30 December 1824.

From then until 1829, the House of Assembly gathered at the newly built York General Hospital, located on the south-east corner of the block bounded by King, Adelaide, John, and Peter Streets; a move that delayed the hospital's opening until the legislative body moved on to the old Court House, which stood on the north side of King Street, between Toronto and Church Streets. In 1832, a new structure was built on Front Street, west of Simcoe Street, and served continuously as the third parliament building of Upper Canada until the province was united with Lower Canada in 1840, after which the joined assembly was relocated by the then Governor General, Charles Poulett Thomson, Baron Sydenham, to the general hospital building in Kingston. The House of Assembly moved in and out of the Front Street building over the ensuing years, relocating for brief periods to Montreal and Quebec City, even at one point adopting a perambulation system that saw parliament relocate between Toronto and Quebec every four years. With mounting displeasure over the transient nature of the Canadian parliament, and an inability on the part of politicians to agree as to where to locate the legislative building, Queen Victoria was asked to make a selection; over all the other cities in the Province of Canada, she chose Bytown (later Ottawa) in 1857.

Today, the site of the first parliament buildings in York is a parking lot for a car wash, a car rental company and a car dealership. Archaeological excavations at the site in 2000 undercovered evidence of the buildings. Subsequently, the property was bought by the Ontario Heritage Trust which operated a Parliament Interpretive Centre at the site from 2012–2015. The dig was covered up to await future plans for the site.

Queen's Park building
On 1 July 1867, however, the province joined with two others in confederation and was split into the present-day provinces of Ontario and Quebec, meaning that new legislatures were established for each of the two new provincial entities. Toronto was chosen as the capital of the former, and the legislative assembly moved back to the same Front Street property that had been home to the House of Assembly for the Province of Canada, despite the structure having been damaged by fire in 1861 and 1862.

Construction then commenced in 1886, and the Ontario Legislative Building was (though still incomplete) officially opened on 4 April 1893 by the then Lieutenant Governor of Ontario, George Airey Kirkpatrick. This left the old parliament building on Front Street vacant, and it stood as such for nearly a decade before it was demolished from 1900 to 1903. The site was then sold to the Grand Trunk Railway, which used the former parliamentary land for freight sheds and marshalling yards. The location is now occupied by the Canadian Broadcasting Centre, a public square, and a number of high-rise buildings.

With an increasing population in the province, it became necessary in 1909 to add a wing to the north side of the Ontario Legislative Building, enclosing the courtyard. As construction was underway, on 1 September men repairing galvanised roofing on the west wing accidentally sparked a fire that eventually destroyed the interior of that part of the edifice, including the legislative library. It then took until 1912 for repairs and reconstructions to be made, and the new wing to be completed. Further expansions of the parliamentary infrastructure were from then on built across the east side of Queen's Park Crescent, with the Whitney Block built in 1925, the Macdonald and Hepburn Blocks completed in 1968, the Mowat and Hearst Blocks in 1969.

Security
Security within the Legislative grounds is provided by the Legislative Security Service, which took over from the Ontario Provincial Police. Some members have been armed with handguns since 2016. The 75-member unit reports to the Sergeant-at-Arms and patrols both Queen's Park and Whitney Block. Most officers of the unit are ranked as Special Constables or Agents.

Portraits of the Premier

The Legislature is also home to portraits of several past premiers, including:

 Bill Davis - by Istvan Nyikos
 Frank Miller - by Anthony Miles
 David Peterson - by Linda Kooluris Dobbs
 Bob Rae - Phil Richards
 Mike Harris - by Istvan Nyikos
 Ernie Eves - by Bernard Poulin
 Dalton McGuinty - by Istvan Nyikos
 Kathleen Wynne - by Linda Kooluris Dobbs

See also
 First Ontario Parliament Buildings
 List of oldest buildings and structures in Toronto

References

External links

 Legislative Assembly of Ontario Web site
 Virtual tour of the Lieutenant Governor's suite
 History of Ontario's Legislative Buildings (Government of Ontario site)
 Ontario historical plaque - Ontario's First Parliament Buildings 1798
 Provincial Parliament Buildings (2nd)
 York Hotel-Toronto Sun
 Report on ASI archaeological dig: Upper Canada’s first parliament buildings: A place of hopes and dreams By Ronald F. Williamson
Legislative buildings in Canada
Ontario government buildings
Buildings and structures in Toronto
Government buildings completed in 1909
Tourist attractions in Toronto
Romanesque Revival architecture in Canada
Legislative Assembly of Ontario
Terminating vistas in Canada
Burned buildings and structures in Canada
Rebuilt buildings and structures in Canada
Official residences in Canada